Edward Makin Cross (1880–1965) was a bishop of Spokane in The Episcopal Church. He had previously been rector of St. John the Evangelist in St. Paul, Minnesota. He was instrumental in the development of a summer camp on Lake Coeur d'Alene which is named for him.

References

1880 births
1965 deaths
20th-century American Episcopalians
Episcopal bishops of Spokane